The Declaration of the Republic was a constitutional declaration issued by the Revolutionary Command Council of Egypt on June 18, 1953. The purpose of this document was to begin Egypt's transition to a republic and to appoint Major General Muhammad Naguib as the republic's President.

Timeline

 The Egyptian Revolution of 1952 demanded that King Farouk abdicate to his son and heir apparent, Prince Ahmed Fouad, and leave the country before 18:30 on July 26, 1952. 
 On December 10, 1952, the dissolution of the Constitution of 1923 was announced by the Revolutionary Command Council. 
 On January 15, 1953, the Revolutionary Command Council abolished political parties and specified a transitional period of three years. 
 On February 10, 1953, the Council issued a constitutional declaration publicizing the provisions for an interim constitution.

Contents
The document claims that the opulent lifestyle of the Muhammad Ali family, specifically Ismai'il Pasha, drove Egypt into debt, which gave foreign militaries a plea to occupy the country. 

The document includes three demands:

 The abolition of the Muhammad Ali monarchy
 The declaration of a republic led by Mohamed Naguib
 The persistence of the Command Council throughout the 'transitional period'

The document ends with a religious note: "We have to trust God and ourselves, and to feel the pride that God has endowed to his faithful worshippers."

Signatories 
 Major General Staff Muhammad Naguib, Leader of the Army Revolution
 Binbashi Staff Gamal Abdul Nasser Hussein
 Wing Commander Gamal Salem
 Wing Commander Abdel Latif Mahmoud Boghdadi
 Binbashi Staff Zakaria Mohieddin
 Binbashi Anwar El-Sadat
 Binbashi Hussein El-Shafei
 Sagh Staff Abdel Hakim Amer
 Sagh Staff Salah el-Din Mustafa Salem
 Sagh Staff Kamal El-Din Hussein
 Squadrons Leader Hassan Ibrahim
 Sagh Khaled Mohieddin

References

1953 in Egypt
1953 documents